In Halacha (Jewish law) a pesik reisha (Lit. cutting off the head) is an action that ordinarily would be permitted but which will definitely cause  an unintended prohibited side effect. A classic case of a Pesik reisha found in the Talmud is opening a door next to a candle on Shabbos (the Jewish Sabbath) where the candle will definitely be blown out.

The opening of the door is permitted, but the extinguishing of the fire is prohibited. A practical case of pesik reisha is the dragging of a heavy chair over soft earth which will definitely result in furrows which constitute the melacha (action) of plowing. As a result, it is forbidden according to Halacha for a Jew to drag a chair over soft earth on Shabbos, which will necessarily result in the creation of furrows (one of the 39 melachot)

The phrase is short for p'sik reisha ve'lo yamut? - Will you cut off its head and it will not die? 
This phrase refers to the most classic case of "p'sik reisha", where if a person cuts off the head of a chicken he cannot expect that it won't die. (Shabbat 103a)

There is extensive literature and discussion amongst the Acharonim in this matter, especially in the Brisker school of Torah-study.

References

External links

 Psik Reisha; by Rabbi Julian Sinclair, March 6, 2009; Jewish Chronicle Online

Jewish law and rituals